Blackstone Army Airfield , also known as Allen C. Perkinson Airport, is located two miles (3 km) east of the central business district of Blackstone, a town in Nottoway County, Virginia, United States. It is owned by the United States Army and the Town of Blackstone.

It is named for Allen C. Perkinson, a CAP Virginia Wing Commander in the 1940s.

History
During World War II the airfield was used by the United States Army Air Forces.   It was used by Third Air Force as a group training airfield, and later by Air Technical Service Command.

Facilities and aircraft
Runway 4/22 can accommodate up to a C-17 airframe(weight capacity of runway is 595,000 lbs). Runway 1/19 accommodates only large UAS traffic. For the 12-month period ending July 31, 2006, the airport had 3,482 aircraft operations, an average of 9 per day: 85% military and 15% general aviation.

Current tenants 
 Virginia Air National Guard
 Fort Pickett Composite Squadron VA-142, Civil Air Patrol

See also

 Fort Pickett
 Virginia Wing Civil Air Patrol
 Virginia World War II Army Airfields

References

External links
 Blackstone Army Airfield at Fort Pickett web site
 Blackstone AAF / A.C. Perkinson Airport at GlobalSecurity.org
 Blackstone Army Air Field / Allen C. Perkinson Municipal Airport page from Virginia Airport Directory
 
 

United States Army airfields
Airports in Virginia
Airfields of the United States Army Air Forces in Virginia
Buildings and structures in Nottoway County, Virginia
Transportation in Nottoway County, Virginia